Inhale/Exhale is the first album by the Swedish grindcore band Nasum. It was released on 26 May 1998 by Relapse Records.

The album cover is a photo taken by Anatoly Zhdanov of a Russian protest against pollution in Russia in the 1980s.

Track listing

Personnel
Nasum
Mieszko Talarczyk - guitars, bass guitar, screaming vocals
Anders Jakobson - drums, death growls

Production
Robert Ahlborg - photography, artwork
Adam Peterson - artwork
William J. Yurkiewicz Jr. - executive producer
Matthew F. Jacobson - executive producer
Mieszko Talarczyk - engineering, mixing, editing, pre-mastering
Anders Jakobson - mixing, layout, logo
Mathias Färm - recording, engineering
Dan Swanö - editing, pre-mastering
Per Lindberg - recording
Dave Shirk - mastering

References

Nasum albums
1998 debut albums
Relapse Records albums